Qasab may refer to:

Qasab (surname)
Qasab, Iran
Burj al-Qasab, Syria
Qasab-e Amir, Iran
Qasab-e Zalkan, Iran
Tal Qasab, Iraq

See also
Qassab, members of the Muslim community or biradari involved in the meat business
Kasab (disambiguation)
Kassab (disambiguation)